The Tiger's Claw is a 1923 American silent drama film directed by Joseph Henabery and written by Jack Cunningham. The film stars Jack Holt, Eva Novak, George Periolat, Bertram Grassby, Aileen Pringle, and Carl Stockdale. It was released on March 18, 1923, by Paramount Pictures.

Cast
Jack Holt as Sam Sandell
Eva Novak as Harriet Halehurst
George Periolat as Henry Frazer Halehurst
Bertram Grassby as Raj Singh
Aileen Pringle as Chameli Brentwood
Carl Stockdale as Sathoo Ram
Frank Butler as Inspector George Malvin
George Field as Prince
Evelyn Selbie as Azun
Frederick Vroom as Colonel Byng
Lucien Littlefield as Goyrem
Robert Cain as Sothern
Robert Dudley as Army Officer

Preservation
No copies of The Tiger's Claw are listed as being in any film archive, making it a lost film.

References

External links

1923 films
1920s English-language films
Silent American drama films
1923 drama films
Paramount Pictures films
Films directed by Joseph Henabery
American black-and-white films
American silent feature films
Films set in India
1920s American films